The Piercy Farmstead is a historic farm complex on Osage Mills Road in Osage Mills, Arkansas.  It includes a c. 1909 vernacular Colonial Revival farmhouse, and is unusual for the collection of ten surviving agricultural outbuildings, including storage buildings, chicken houses, a barn, privy, grain crib, and well house.  The house is a two-story wood-frame structure, with a rear extension giving it a T shape.  A single-story porch with simple classical columns extends across the symmetrical front.

The property was listed on the National Register of Historic Places in 1988.

See also
National Register of Historic Places listings in Benton County, Arkansas

References

Farms on the National Register of Historic Places in Arkansas
Buildings and structures completed in 1909
National Register of Historic Places in Benton County, Arkansas
1909 establishments in Arkansas
Colonial Revival architecture in Arkansas